Great Court may refer to:

 Trinity Great Court at Trinity College, Cambridge, England
 Queen Elizabeth II Great Court at the British Museum, London, England
 Great Court, University of Queensland, a heritage-listed university site at the University of Queensland, St Lucia, City of Brisbane, Queensland, Australia
 Great Court, one of the ruins of ancient Baalbek, known as Heliopolis in Greek and Roman antiquity
 Great Courts, the alternative name of Jimmy Connors Pro Tennis Tour